The Battle of Paštrik was a two-week confrontation between the KLA with NATO's support against the Federal Republic of Yugoslavia in 1999, during the Kosovo War. The official goal of the KLA was to seize the border between Albania and Kosovo, and eliminate the Yugoslav units there.

KLA fighters managed to seize Mount Paštrik, its northern slopes and the village of Milaj, on the northern bank of the White Drin by the end of May. In spite of heavy NATO air support, which included the use of USAF B-52 bombers, the Yugoslav Army held the line on the White Drin, where they build temporary bridges to maintain their supply lines open, supported by heavy mortars and artillery. The KLA took over the villages of Planeja, Bucare and Ljumbarda and a stretch of the border area northwest of Prizren, but was unable to make further gains by the time of the Kumanovo Agreement on 9 June, which resulted in Yugoslav troops withdrawing from Kosovo.

Background 
In April 1999 a month prior to the battle, Albanian refugees from Gorozup, Milaj, Gjonaj and Planeja at the slopes of Mount Pashtrik reported that they had been beaten, killed and forcefully driven out of their villages by Yugoslav army, police and paramilitaries. The terrain between Kosovo and Albania which is mountainous only allows a few passages, the Yugoslav army sought to create defensive chain which they believed would repel a ground attack by the KLA. The Pashtrik area was particularly vulnerable if attacked by light infantry, the Yugoslav army was aware of this and established a series of watchtowers and observation posts at strategic points near the Albanian border.

The KLA had received training and arms from the Albanian army and western agencies, during this period the KLA also focused on recruiting ethnic Albanian veterans from the wars in Croatia and Bosnia. Agim Çeku the most prominent commander during the battle was an officer in the Croatian army during Operation Medak Pocket, and Operation Storm. The KLA high command was vague in their statements about the operation. Their official goal was to capture mount Pashtrik and the forward operation bases there. Western media reported that the KLAs goal was the capture the highway linking Peja and Prizren several kilometers north of Pashtrik and some even more ambitious reports placed the capture of Prizren as a goal. These scenarios and media reports have been assessed as unrealistic as the KLA could have captured Prizren only under prolonged ground attacks and air strikes. The political goals of the KLA were not to secure a military victory but to put the 549th under fire and send a message that this was a prelude to a much larger NATO ground invasion. The KLAs force was reported to be as high as 4000 men by some western sources. Albanian TV only stated the units involved being the 121st 'Ismet Jashari' Brigade and the 123rd Brigade. both were a part of the Operational Zone Pashtrik. Wesley Clark put the number of KLA insurgents at between 1800-2000. The KLA was supported by tank and artillery fire from the Albanian army and Close air support from NATO.

Battle

26–29 May: Initial KLA attack 
The KLA offensive began at 04:00, the KLA attacked across a ten mile front from their operating areas, they were supported by barrages from the Albanian army and NATO air support. The KLA quickly overran Yugoslav observation points and watchtowers. Once past the border some units appear to have gone to the northern side of the mountain from which they cold observe the city of Gjakova. Other units went over the mountain or to the forests south of it. When Colonel Delić realized an offensive was underway, he order his troops to entrench and responded to the attack with howitzer and mortars. He ordered his artillery to target the avenues leading to the mountain. These barrages compromised the KLAs offensive capabilities for the next two days. Despite extensive use of NATO air strikes, they did little to stop Yugoslav artillery from attacking KLA supply lines within Albania. As combat continued in the border settlements, KLA sources reported that they had overrun Planeja and were moving towards Gjonaj.

1 June: Increased NATO air strikes 
On 1 June NATO aircraft launched around 150 sorties on VJ targets. NATO claimed to have hit 32 artillery pieces, 9 armored personal carriers, 6 armored vehicles, 4 other military vehicles, 8 mortar positions and one SA6 surface to air missile. NATO throughout the campaign kept the KLA at an arms length. The KLA offensive had reached a stalemate, and the Yugoslav army appeared to be organizing a counter offensive. NATO fearing Milošević would get a better position at the negotiating if they recaptured the gains made by the KLA stepped up their bombing campaign. According to Diana Priest Wesley Clark told his officers "That mountain is not going to get lost. I'm not going to have Serbs on that mountain. We'll pay for that hill with American blood if we don't help [the KLA] hold it." Some NATO air strikes hit KLA positions, however the KLA did not suffer any casualties from NATO friendly fire at that time. These air strikes gave the KLA opportunities to attack. The Yugoslav army responded to this by shelling settlements at the border with Albania including the settlements of Pergolaj, Golaj and Krumë. These strikes didn't hit any civilian targets, but increased the refugee flows in Kukës and put pressure on the administration. Albania responded to this by mobilizing its army to the border and conducting a high profile live fire exercise.

6–9 June: Stalemate 
On 6 June, the Yugoslav army launched a counter offensive near Planeja. As the Yugoslav soldiers advanced towards Planeja, they were hit by 82 unguided M-82 iron bombs from two B52-s and a B-1B. There are conflicting accounts about the casualties suffered by the Yugoslav troops. According to some testimonies from KLA fighters, they suffered serious casualties but according to other KLA reports most were able to get into safety before the impact. A ground inspection by German KFOR troops following the end of hostilities found no wreckages of any vehicles or tanks. On June 7, bombing and ground fighting continued around Paštrik. On June 9, the Yugoslav army retreated and the Military Technical Agreement was signed for the withdrawal of all Yugoslav forces from Kosovo.

Aftermath 
Despite the failure of the KLA to reach its operational objective, it has been regarded as one of the most important factors in Slobodan Milošević's decision to sign the Kumanovo Treaty. According to one US official, "'Milosevic lost his nerve when ground power, in the form of the Kosovar offensive and the capability of Task Force Hawk to take advantage of the offensive to illuminate the battlefield with its intelligence, surveillance and reconnaissance assets, first unlocked the full capability of airpower."

References

Bibliography

 
 

Military operations of the Kosovo War
Battles involving FR Yugoslavia
Battles involving Albania
Albania–Yugoslavia relations
1999 in Kosovo
1999 in Serbia
Conflicts in 1999
Kosovo Liberation Army
May 1999 events in Europe
June 1999 events in Europe
NATO intervention in the former Yugoslavia